Neil McMahon (born 1949) is the author of ten novels, as well as a collaboration with James Patterson—Toys—which was a New York Times #1 Bestseller.  He has written two series: the Carroll Monks books (Twice Dying, Blood Double, To The Bone, Revolution No. 9), and the Hugh Davoren books (Lone Creek, Dead Silver). In the late 1980s he wrote three horror novels (all originally published under the pseudonym "Daniel Rhodes") that have been reissued as ebooks.

McMahon was a Stegner Fellow at Stanford.  His novels have been praised by fellow writers Michael Connelly, James Crumley, Annick Smith, William Kittredge, C.J. Box, Deirdre McNamer, Andrew Schneider and many others.  He lives in Missoula, Montana.

A complete list of McMahon's published novels:

 Next, After Lucifer — 1987 — originally published under the pseudonym "Daniel Rhodes" — reissued as ebook in 2011
 Adversary — 1988 — originally published under the pseudonym "Daniel Rhodes" — reissued as ebook in 2011
 Kiss of Death — 1990 — originally published under the pseudonym "Daniel Rhodes" — reissued as ebook in 2011 with new title, Cast Angels Down to Hell
 Twice Dying — 2000 — first of four novels featuring the protagonist Carroll Monks
 Blood Double — 2002
 To The Bone — 2003
 Revolution No. 9 — 2005
 Lone Creek — 2007 —  first of two novels featuring the protagonist Hugh Davoren
 Dead Silver — 2008
 L.A. Mental — 2011
 Toys — 2011 — collaboration with James Patterson

External links
 Interview with author and his editor at Shelf Awareness
 Previous book list and photo at HarperCollins Publishers  (Official publisher website)

1949 births
Living people
20th-century American novelists
21st-century American novelists
American male novelists
American thriller writers
Writers from Missoula, Montana
20th-century American male writers
21st-century American male writers